Suzanne Lee Snively  is an American company director and economic strategist in New Zealand.

Biography 
Snively was born in the United States and came to New Zealand on a scholarship from the Fulbright Program in 1972. 

She has served as a director of the Reserve Bank of New Zealand, of the New Zealand Army Leadership Board, an economic consultant to Housing New Zealand, and is a member of the Institute of Directors and the New Zealand Association of Economists.

Snively is chair of Transparency International New Zealand, part of an independent global initiative fighting corruption.

Recognition 
In 1993, Snively received a New Zealand Suffrage Centennial Medal. In the 2005 Queen's Birthday Honours, she was appointed an Honorary Officer of the New Zealand Order of Merit, for services to business. In 2013, she was named Wellingtonian of the Year. 

In the 2021 New Year Honours, Snively was promoted to Honorary Dame Companion of the New Zealand Order of Merit, for services to governance.

Personal life 
Snively is married to broadcaster Ian Fraser.

References 

Living people
American emigrants to New Zealand
Year of birth missing (living people)
Recipients of the New Zealand Suffrage Centennial Medal 1993
New Zealand economists
Honorary Dames Companion of the New Zealand Order of Merit